Mongke (also Mönkh, Monkh, Munkh) means "eternal" in Mongolian language and may refer to:

Peoples

Medieval
 Möngke Khan (1209–1259), Great khan of the Mongol Empire
 Yesü Möngke, khan of Chagatai khanate, 1247–1252
 Mengu-Timur (d. 1282), also known as Mongke Temur, khan of the Golden Horde, 1267–1280
 Tuda-Mengu, also known as Tode Mongke, khan of the Golden Horde from 1280 to 1287
 Möngke Temür, also known as Mengtemu, chieftain of the Jianzhou Jurchen 1405–1433
 Batumöngke Dayan Khan, khan of the Northern Yuan Dynasty 1479–1517

Modern
 Mengke Bateer, Chinese professional basketball player, formerly in the NBA.
 Uranchimegiin Mönkh-Erdene, amateur boxer from Mongolia
 Mönkhbaataryn Bundmaa, judoka for Mongolia

Geographic and populated places 
 Mount Mönkh Saridag, mountain located in Mongolian-Russian border.
 Mount Mönkhkhairkhan, mountain in Mongolia.
Mönkhkhairkhan, Khovd, district of Khovd Province

See also 
 Mengü, the Turkic equivalent
 Mengi, the Turkic equivalent